The 15 August 2011 Iraq attacks were a series of terrorist incidents that took place across Iraq. At least 37 were killed and 68 injured in Kut after a roadside bomb and a car bomb exploded in the center of the city. A string of bombings and shootings in the capital took the lives of two and left 27 wounded. Eight were killed and 14 injured in a suicide car bombings in Khan Bani Saad City. Two car bombs exploded in the Najaf, killing 6 and injuring 79, followed by another blast near Karbala that killed 4 and injured 41. Numerous other attacks throughout the central and northern parts of Iraq (including a double suicide bombing in Tikrit) left 7 dead and at least 58 wounded.

See also

 List of terrorist incidents, 2011

References 

2011 murders in Iraq
21st-century mass murder in Iraq
August 2011 events in Iraq
Islamic terrorist incidents in 2011
Mass murder in 2011
Spree shootings in Iraq
Suicide car and truck bombings in Iraq
Suicide bombings in Iraq
Terrorist incidents in Baghdad
Terrorist incidents in Iraq in 2011